Luo Zongshi (born 14 October 1998) is a Chinese taekwondo athlete. She won the gold medal in the women's featherweight event at the 2022 World Taekwondo Championships held in Guadalajara, Mexico. She also won the gold medal at the 2018 Asian Games on the women's featherweight event.

References 

Chinese female taekwondo practitioners
Living people
1998 births
Taekwondo practitioners at the 2018 Asian Games
Medalists at the 2018 Asian Games
Asian Games gold medalists for China
Asian Games medalists in taekwondo
Asian Taekwondo Championships medalists
21st-century Chinese women
World Taekwondo Championships medalists